Utting am Ammersee (until 1953 just Utting) is a municipality in the district of Landsberg in Bavaria in Germany.

History

During World War II, a subcamp of Dachau concentration camp was located in the town.

Transport

The municipality has a railway station, on the Mering–Weilheim line.

References

External links
  European Holocaust Memorial - a monument ensemble against racism and totalitarianism at the place of the crime - under the executive management of the Citizens´ Association European Holocaust Memorial Foundation
 The Holocaust in the Landsberg area- Citizens´ Association "Landsberg in the 20th Century" (English)

Landsberg (district)
Ammersee